St. George's Hall may refer to:
St George's Hall, Bradford
St. George's Hall, Liverpool
St. George's Hall, Reading
St. George's Hall, state room at Windsor Castle
St George's Hall and Apollo Room of the Winter Palace, Saint Petersburg
St. George's Hall, London, a theatre located at Langham Place, Regent Street & St. Marylebone in London, England
St George's Bristol
St. George's Hall, housing the Arts and Letters Club in Toronto
The Hall of the Order of St. George in the Grand Kremlin Palace

Architectural disambiguation pages